Joseph Oakland Hirschfelder (May 27, 1911 – March 30, 1990) was an American physicist who participated in the Manhattan Project and in the creation of the nuclear bomb.

Biography 
Hirschfelder was born in Baltimore, Maryland, the son of a Jewish couple, Arthur Douglas and May Rosalie (Straus). He completed his undergraduate studies at the University of Minnesota from 1927 to 1929 and at Yale University from 1929 to 1931. Hirschfelder received doctorates in physics and chemistry from Princeton University under the direction of Eugene Wigner, Henry Eyring and Hugh Stott Taylor. He worked as a Postdoctoral fellow with John von Neumann for a year after his PhD at the Institute for Advanced Study. In 1937, he moved to University of Wisconsin and stayed there until retirement in 1981, except during World War II.
Robert Oppenheimer assembled a team at the Los Alamos Laboratory to work on plutonium gun design Thin Man, that included senior engineer Edwin McMillan and senior physicists Charles Critchfield and Joseph Hirschfelder. Hirschfelder had been working on internal ballistics. Oppenheimer led the design effort himself until June 1943, when Navy Captain William Sterling Parsons arrived took over the Ordnance and Engineering Division and direct management of the "Thin Man" project.
Hirschfelder was a member of the National Academy of Sciences, a group leader in theoretical physics and ordnance at the Los Alamos Atomic Bomb Laboratory, chief phenomenologist at the nuclear bomb tests at Bikini, the founder of the Theoretical Chemistry Institute and the Homer Adkins professor emeritus of chemistry at the University of Wisconsin.

Hirschfelder was also a fellow of the American Academy of Arts and Sciences. He was awarded the National Medal of Science from President Gerald Ford “for his fundamental contributions to atomic and molecular quantum mechanics, the theory of the rates of chemical reactions, and the structure and properties of gases and liquids”.

The National Academies Press called him "one of the leading figures in theoretical chemistry during the period 1935–90". In 1991 an award was established in his name by the University of Wisconsin's Theoretical Chemistry Institute – the annual Joseph O. Hirschfelder Prize in Theoretical Chemistry. He was an elected member of the International Academy of Quantum Molecular Science. His book Molecular theory of gases and liquids is an authoritative text on the kinetic theories of gases and liquids.

Awards and distinctions 
 1953 - elected to the National Academy of Sciences
 1959 - elected to the American Academy of Arts and Sciences
 1965 - elected to the Norwegian Royal Society
 1966 - the Peter Debye Award from the American Chemical Society
 1966 - the Alfred C. Egerton Gold Medal of the Combustion Institute
 1976 - the National Medal of Science
 1978 - honorary degree from Marquette University
 1980 - honorary degree the University of Southern California
 1981 - elected to the Royal Society of Chemistry of Great Britain
 1981 - the Silver Medal of the American Society of Mechanical Engineers

Joseph O. Hirschfelder Prize is awarded annually by the Department of Chemistry at the University of Wisconsin in honor of Hirschfelder.

References

External links
 

1911 births
1990 deaths
20th-century American physicists
20th-century American chemists
American nuclear physicists
Jewish physicists
Jewish chemists
Jewish American scientists
Manhattan Project people
Nuclear weapons scientists and engineers
Members of the United States National Academy of Sciences
University of Wisconsin–Madison faculty
Members of the International Academy of Quantum Molecular Science
20th-century American Jews